Gabriel Dias may refer to:

 Gabriel (futsal) (born 1980), Gabriel da Silva Dias, Brazilian futsal flank
 Gabriel Dias (racing driver) (born 1990), Brazilian racing driver
 Gabriel Dias (footballer) (born 1994), Brazilian football defensive midfielder

See also
 Gabriela Dias Moreschi (born 1994), Brazilian handballer
 Gabriela Mantellato Dias (born 1991), Brazilian water polo player
 Gabriel Díaz (disambiguation)